Shin Bum-chul (신범철; born 27 September 1970) is a South Korean former football goalkeeper and current goalkeeping coach. He played at the 1992 Barcelona Olympic Games and 1994 Hiroshima Asian Games as national team player

Honors and awards

Individual
 K-League Best XI: 1997

References

External links
 
 FIFA Player Statistics
 

1970 births
Living people
Association football goalkeepers
South Korean footballers
South Korea international footballers
Footballers at the 1992 Summer Olympics
Olympic footballers of South Korea
Busan IPark players
Suwon Samsung Bluewings players
Incheon United FC players
K League 1 players
FC Seoul non-playing staff
Ajou University alumni
Footballers at the 1994 Asian Games
Asian Games competitors for South Korea